Pope John Paul II entered the papacy in 1978 as an avid sportsman, enjoying hiking and swimming.  The 58-year-old was extremely healthy and active for his age, jogging in the Vatican gardens to the horror of Vatican staff, who informed him that his jogging could be seen by tourists climbing to the summit of the dome of St. Peter's Basilica. The pope's response, according to media reports, was "so what?"  When the cost of installing a swimming pool in his summer residence was queried by cardinals, John Paul joked that it was "cheaper than another conclave".

John Paul's obvious physical fitness and looks earned much comment in the media following his election, which compared his health and trim figure to the poor health of John Paul I and Paul VI, the portliness of Pope John XXIII and the constant claims of ailments of Pius XII. The only modern pope with a keep-fit regime had been Pope Pius XI (r: 1922-1939) who was an avid mountain climber. An Irish Independent article in the 1980s labelled John Paul "the keep-fit pope".

However, after over twenty-five years on the papal throne, two assassination attempts (one of which resulted in severe physical injury to the Pope), and a number of cancer scares, John Paul's physical health declined.

1981 assassination attempt

The 1981 assassination attempt was costlier to his overall health than was generally known by the public at the time. Rushed to the Agostino Gemelli University Polyclinic to undergo emergency surgery, he experienced profound bleeding leading to a dangerous fall in blood pressure and to cardiac arrest, which was however successfully defibrillated. He received the Anointing of the Sick (formerly known as "Last Rites"). Despite difficulties with extensive blood transfusions, which are speculated to have transmitted cytomegalovirus (CMV) infection, surgery was eventually successful. The bullet had passed completely through the body, puncturing the intestines and necessitating a colostomy. Seven weeks later, discussions were held about reversing the colostomy and eight of nine doctors voted against it, arguing the Pope was still too weak from the CMV infection. Saying "I don't want to continue half dead and half alive", the Pope effectively overruled his physicians and the reversal was done successfully on August 5, 1981.

Later years
Despite the shooting and the complications during recovery, John Paul remained in good physical condition throughout the 1980s, and remained active as well. During the 1990s John Paul's health began to decline. A benign intestinal tumor was removed in 1992; he experienced two falls in 1993 and 1994 which dislocated his shoulder and broke his femur respectively; and he underwent an appendectomy in 1996. In December 1995, he had to suspend his urbi et orbi blessing on Christmas Day after a dizzy spell.

An orthopaedic surgeon confirmed in 2001 that Pope John Paul II was suffering from Parkinson's disease, as international observers had suspected for some time; this was acknowledged publicly by the Vatican in 2003. Despite difficulty speaking more than a few sentences at a time, trouble hearing and severe osteoarthrosis, he continued to tour the world, although rarely walking in public. Some of those who met him late in his life said that although physically he was in poor shape, mentally he remained fully alert.

However, that claim was disputed by among others Rowan Williams, the Archbishop of Canterbury, and Mary McAleese, the President of Ireland, in their accounts of meetings with him in 2003. After John Paul II's death, Williams told The Sunday Times of a meeting with the Pope, during which he had paid tribute to one of John Paul's encyclicals. According to Williams, John Paul II showed no recognition . An aide whispered in the pope's ear, but was overheard reminding John Paul about the encyclical. However the Pope still showed no recognition. Papal critic John Cornwell claimed that, after Williams and his entourage left, the Pope turned to an aide and asked "tell me, who were those people?"

According to Cornwell, Mary McAleese told the British Catholic newspaper The Universe of a visit as President of Ireland to John Paul where he struggled to talk about the Irish College in Rome, where Irish seminarians in the city are trained and to which the Pope prior to his election had often travelled. "He wanted to be reminded of where the Irish College was, and when he heard that it was very close to St. John Lateran's basilica he wanted to be reminded where that was too."

Final days
On 1 February 2005, the Pope was taken to the Gemelli Hospital suffering from acute inflammation and spasm of the larynx, brought on by a bout of influenza. He was released, but in late February 2005 he began having trouble breathing, and he was rushed back. A tracheotomy was performed, allowing him to breathe more easily, but limiting his speaking ability, to which he reacted with evident frustration during a failed attempt at public speaking from the window of the hospital ward.

On Palm Sunday (20 March 2005) the Pope made a brief appearance at his window and silently waved an olive branch to pilgrims. Two days later there were renewed concerns for his health after reports stated that he had taken a turn for the worse and was not responding to medication. By the end of the month, speculation was growing. The Vatican officials confirmed that he was nearing death when on March 31, 2005 at around 11:00 am, the pope, who had gone to the chapel to celebrate Mass, was beset by strong shivers which was followed by high fever because of a urinary tract infection. Despite the use of antibiotics, the disease progressed and he developed sepsis and multiple organ failure. He was not rushed to the hospital again, however, and equipment for medical monitoring was brought to his residence in the Vatican, where he was followed by a team of top physicians. On 2 April 2005 at 9:37 pm, he died in his apartment at 84 years and 319 days of age, 46 days before his 85th birthday. The pope is reported to have died looking towards the window as he prayed, raising his right hand as if he is aware of the crowds present in St. Peter's Square where he made an effort to say "Amen" and his life ended. The illumination of a third light in the papal apartment makes some onlookers in the square knew that the end had come. His death was confirmed when an electrocardiogram signal remained flat for more than 20 minutes.

The Pope was the third-longest serving Pope ever in history, after the first Pope St. Peter and Pope Pius IX. He died after 26 years and 162 days of papacy. He was buried in presence of millions on 8 April 2005.

References

Health
John Paul II
Pope John Paul II